The following species and natural hybrids in the flowering plant genus Ilex, the hollies, are accepted by Plants of the World Online. Ilex has the most species of any woody dioecious angiosperm genus.

Ilex abscondita 
Ilex aculeolata 
Ilex acutidenticulata 
Ilex affinis 
Ilex aggregata 
Ilex alternifolia 
Ilex altiplana 
Ilex amazonensis 
Ilex ambigua 
Ilex amelanchier 
Ilex amplifolia 
Ilex amygdalina 
Ilex andicola 
Ilex angulata 
Ilex angustissima 
Ilex annamensis 
Ilex anodonta 
Ilex anomala 
Ilex anonoides 
Ilex antonii 
Ilex apicidens 
Ilex apiensis 
Ilex aquifolium 
Ilex aracamuniana 
Ilex archeri 
Ilex ardisiifrons 
Ilex argentina 
Ilex arimensis 
Ilex arisanensis 
Ilex arnhemensis 
Ilex asperula 
Ilex asprella 
Ilex atabapoensis 
Ilex atrata 
Ilex × attenuata 
Ilex auricula 
Ilex austrosinensis 
Ilex azuensis 
Ilex baasiana 
Ilex bahiahondica 
Ilex barahonica 
Ilex belizensis 
Ilex berteroi 
Ilex bidens 
Ilex bidoupensis 
Ilex bioritsensis 
Ilex biserrulata 
Ilex blancheana 
Ilex blanchetii 
Ilex boliviana 
Ilex brachyphylla 
Ilex brandegeeana 
Ilex brasiliensis 
Ilex brevicuspis 
Ilex brevipedicellata 
Ilex buergeri 
Ilex bullata 
Ilex buxifolia 
Ilex buxoides 
Ilex calcicola 
Ilex canariensis 
Ilex cardonae 
Ilex casiquiarensis 
Ilex cassine 
Ilex cauliflora 
Ilex celebensis 
Ilex centrochinensis 
Ilex cerasifolia 
Ilex chamaebuxus 
Ilex chamaedryfolia 
Ilex championii 
Ilex chapaensis 
Ilex chengbuensis 
Ilex chengkouensis 
Ilex cheniana 
Ilex chevalieri 
Ilex chinensis 
Ilex chingiana 
Ilex chiriquensis 
Ilex chuguangii 
Ilex chuniana 
Ilex ciliolata 
Ilex cinerea 
Ilex clementis 
Ilex clethriflora 
Ilex cochinchinensis 
Ilex cognata 
Ilex colchica 
Ilex collina 
Ilex colombiana 
Ilex condensata 
Ilex condorensis 
Ilex confertiflora 
Ilex congesta 
Ilex conocarpa 
Ilex cookii 
Ilex corallina 
Ilex coriacea 
Ilex cornuta 
Ilex costaricensis 
Ilex costata 
Ilex cowanii 
Ilex crassifolioides 
Ilex crenata 
Ilex cubana 
Ilex cuiabensis 
Ilex culmenicola 
Ilex curranii 
Ilex cuthbertii 
Ilex cuzcoana 
Ilex cymosa 
Ilex cyrtura 
Ilex dabieshanensis 
Ilex danielis 
Ilex daphnogenea 
Ilex dasyclada 
Ilex dasyphylla 
Ilex davidsei 
Ilex decidua 
Ilex dehongensis 
Ilex delavayi 
Ilex densifolia 
Ilex denticulata 
Ilex depressifructu 
Ilex dianguiensis 
Ilex dicarpa 
Ilex dictyoneura 
Ilex dimorphophylla 
Ilex dioica 
Ilex diospyroides 
Ilex dipyrena 
Ilex discolor 
Ilex diuretica 
Ilex divaricata 
Ilex dolichopoda 
Ilex duarteensis 
Ilex dugesii 
Ilex duidae 
Ilex dumosa 
Ilex editicostata 
Ilex elliptica 
Ilex elmerrilliana 
Ilex embelioides 
Ilex emmae 
Ilex englishii 
Ilex eoa 
Ilex ericoides 
Ilex estriata 
Ilex euryoides 
Ilex excavata 
Ilex excelsa 
Ilex fanshawei 
Ilex farallonensis 
Ilex fargesii 
Ilex fengqingensis 
Ilex ferruginea 
Ilex ficifolia 
Ilex ficoidea 
Ilex floribunda 
Ilex florifera 
Ilex flosparva 
Ilex formosana 
Ilex forrestii 
Ilex fragilis 
Ilex friburgensis 
Ilex fruticosa 
Ilex fuertensiana 
Ilex fukienensis 
Ilex gabinetensis 
Ilex gabrielleana 
Ilex gagnepainiana 
Ilex gale 
Ilex gansuensis 
Ilex gardneriana 
Ilex geniculata 
Ilex georgei 
Ilex glabella 
Ilex glabra 
Ilex glaucophylla 
Ilex glazioviana 
Ilex gleasoniana 
Ilex glomerata 
Ilex godajam 
Ilex goshiensis 
Ilex gotardensis 
Ilex goudotii 
Ilex graciliflora 
Ilex grandiflora 
Ilex gransabanensis 
Ilex guaiquinimae 
Ilex guangnanensis 
Ilex guaramacalensis 
Ilex guayusa 
Ilex guerreroii 
Ilex guianensis 
Ilex guizhouensis 
Ilex gundlachiana 
Ilex haberi 
Ilex hahnii 
Ilex hainanensis 
Ilex hanceana 
Ilex harmandiana 
Ilex harrisii 
Ilex havilandii 
Ilex hayatana 
Ilex hemiepiphytica 
Ilex hicksii 
Ilex hippocrateoides 
Ilex hirsuta 
Ilex holstii 
Ilex honbaensis 
Ilex hondurensis 
Ilex hongiaoensis 
Ilex hookeri 
Ilex huachamacariana 
Ilex hualgayoca 
Ilex huana 
Ilex huberi 
Ilex hylonoma 
Ilex hypaneura 
Ilex hypoglauca 
Ilex ignicola 
Ilex ijuensis 
Ilex illustris 
Ilex impressa 
Ilex integerrima 
Ilex integra 
Ilex intermedia 
Ilex intricata 
Ilex inundata 
Ilex jacobsii 
Ilex jamaicana 
Ilex jaramillana 
Ilex jauaensis 
Ilex jelskii 
Ilex jenmanii 
Ilex jiangmenensis 
Ilex jiaolingensis 
Ilex jingxiensis 
Ilex jinyunensis 
Ilex jiuwanshanensis 
Ilex julianii 
Ilex juttana 
Ilex karstenii 
Ilex karuaiana 
Ilex kaushue 
Ilex kelabitana 
Ilex kelsallii 
Ilex kengii 
Ilex keranjiensis 
Ilex ketambensis 
Ilex khasiana 
Ilex kiangsiensis 
Ilex kinabaluensis 
Ilex kingiana 
Ilex × kiusiana 
Ilex knucklesensis 
Ilex kobuskiana 
Ilex krugiana 
Ilex kunmingensis 
Ilex kunthiana 
Ilex kusanoi 
Ilex kwangtungensis 
Ilex laevigata 
Ilex lamprophylla 
Ilex lancilimba 
Ilex lasseri 
Ilex latifolia 
Ilex latifrons 
Ilex laureola 
Ilex laurina 
Ilex leucoclada 
Ilex liana 
Ilex liangii 
Ilex liebmannii 
Ilex liesneri 
Ilex lihuaiensis 
Ilex lilianeae 
Ilex linii 
Ilex litseifolia 
Ilex liukiuensis 
Ilex loeseneri 
Ilex lohfauensis 
Ilex longecaudata 
Ilex longipes 
Ilex longipetiolata 
Ilex longipilosa 
Ilex longzhouensis 
Ilex lonicerifolia 
Ilex loranthoides 
Ilex loretoica 
Ilex ludianensis 
Ilex lundii 
Ilex maasiana 
Ilex macarenensis 
Ilex macbridiana 
Ilex macfadyenii 
Ilex machilifolia 
Ilex maclurei 
Ilex macrocarpa 
Ilex macropoda 
Ilex macrostigma 
Ilex magnifolia 
Ilex magnifructa 
Ilex maguirei 
Ilex maigualidensis 
Ilex maingayi 
Ilex × makinoi 
Ilex malabarica 
Ilex malaccensis 
Ilex mandonii 
Ilex manitzii 
Ilex manneiensis 
Ilex marahuacae 
Ilex marginata 
Ilex martiniana 
Ilex matanoana 
Ilex maxima 
Ilex maximowicziana 
Ilex medogensis 
Ilex megalophylla 
Ilex megaphylla 
Ilex melanophylla 
Ilex memecylifolia 
Ilex mertensii 
Ilex mesilauensis 
Ilex metabaptista 
Ilex micrantha 
Ilex micrococca 
Ilex microdonta 
Ilex microphylla 
Ilex microsticta 
Ilex microwrightioides 
Ilex miguensis 
Ilex mitis 
Ilex montana 
Ilex montebellensis 
Ilex mucronata 
Ilex mucronulata 
Ilex mucugensis 
Ilex myricoides 
Ilex myrtifolia 
Ilex myrtillus 
Ilex nanchuanensis 
Ilex nanningensis 
Ilex nayana 
Ilex neblinensis 
Ilex nemorosa 
Ilex neocaledonica 
Ilex neomamillata 
Ilex neoreticulata 
Ilex nervosa 
Ilex nervulosa 
Ilex nigropunctata 
Ilex ningdeensis 
Ilex nipponica 
Ilex nitida 
Ilex nitidissima 
Ilex nothofagifolia 
Ilex nothophoeboides 
Ilex nubicola 
Ilex nuculicava 
Ilex nummularia 
Ilex obcordata 
Ilex oblonga 
Ilex obtusata 
Ilex occulta 
Ilex odorata 
Ilex oligodonta 
Ilex oligoneura 
Ilex oliveriana 
Ilex omeiensis 
Ilex opaca 
Ilex organensis 
Ilex ovalifolia 
Ilex ovalis 
Ilex × owariensis 
Ilex pachyphylla 
Ilex pallida 
Ilex paltorioides 
Ilex paraguariensis 
Ilex paruensis 
Ilex parvifructa 
Ilex patens 
Ilex pauciflora 
Ilex paucinervia 
Ilex paujiensis 
Ilex pedunculosa 
Ilex peiradena 
Ilex pentagona 
Ilex perado 
Ilex perlata 
Ilex permicrophylla 
Ilex pernervata 
Ilex pernyi 
Ilex perryana 
Ilex petiolaris 
Ilex phanganensis 
Ilex phillyreifolia 
Ilex pingheensis 
Ilex pingnanensis 
Ilex poiensis 
Ilex poilanei 
Ilex polita 
Ilex polypyrena 
Ilex praetermissa 
Ilex pringlei 
Ilex promecophylla 
Ilex prostrata 
Ilex psammophila 
Ilex pseudobuxus 
Ilex pseudoebenacea 
Ilex pseudomachilifolia 
Ilex pseudo-odorata 
Ilex pseudothea 
Ilex pseudotheezans 
Ilex pseudoumbelliformis 
Ilex pseudovaccinium 
Ilex ptariana 
Ilex pubescens 
Ilex pubifructa 
Ilex pubigera 
Ilex pubilimba 
Ilex pustulosa 
Ilex pyrifolia 
Ilex qianlingshanensis 
Ilex qingyuanensis 
Ilex quercetorum 
Ilex quitensis 
Ilex ramonensis 
Ilex rarasanensis 
Ilex renae 
Ilex retusa 
Ilex retusifolia 
Ilex revoluta 
Ilex rimbachii 
Ilex robusta 
Ilex robustinervosa 
Ilex rotunda 
Ilex rubra 
Ilex rubrinervia 
Ilex rugosa 
Ilex rupicola 
Ilex salicina 
Ilex sanqingshanensis 
Ilex sapiiformis 
Ilex sapotifolia 
Ilex savannarum 
Ilex saxicola 
Ilex schwackeana 
Ilex sclerophylla 
Ilex sclerophylloides 
Ilex scopulorum 
Ilex scutiiformis 
Ilex sebertii 
Ilex serrata 
Ilex servinii 
Ilex sessiliflora 
Ilex sessilifructa 
Ilex shennongjiaensis 
Ilex shimeica 
Ilex shukunii 
Ilex shweliensis 
Ilex sideroxyloides 
Ilex sikkimensis 
Ilex sinica 
Ilex sipapoana 
Ilex socorroensis 
Ilex soderstromii 
Ilex solida 
Ilex spicata 
Ilex spinigera 
Ilex spinulosa 
Ilex spruceana 
Ilex stellata 
Ilex stenocarpa 
Ilex stenura 
Ilex sterrophylla 
Ilex stewardii 
Ilex steyermarkii 
Ilex strigillosa 
Ilex suaveolens 
Ilex subcaudata 
Ilex subcordata 
Ilex subcrenata 
Ilex suber 
Ilex subficoidea 
Ilex sublongecaudata 
Ilex subodorata 
Ilex subrotundifolia 
Ilex subrugosa 
Ilex subtriflora 
Ilex sugerokii 
Ilex suichangensis 
Ilex summa 
Ilex suprema 
Ilex suzukii 
Ilex synpyrena 
Ilex syzygiophylla 
Ilex szechwanensis 
Ilex tadiandamolensis 
Ilex tahanensis 
Ilex tamii 
Ilex tarapotina 
Ilex tateana 
Ilex taubertiana 
Ilex tectonica 
Ilex tenuis 
Ilex tepuiana 
Ilex teratopis 
Ilex tetramera 
Ilex theezans 
Ilex thyrsiflora 
Ilex tiricae 
Ilex tonii 
Ilex tonkinensis 
Ilex toroidea 
Ilex trachyphylla 
Ilex trichocarpa 
Ilex trichoclada 
Ilex trichothyrsa 
Ilex triflora 
Ilex truxillensis 
Ilex tsangii 
Ilex tsiangiana 
Ilex tsoi 
Ilex tugitakayamensis 
Ilex tutcheri 
Ilex uaramae 
Ilex uleana 
Ilex umbellata 
Ilex umbellulata 
Ilex uniflora 
Ilex uraiensis 
Ilex urbaniana 
Ilex urceolatus 
Ilex vacciniifolia 
Ilex valenzuelana 
Ilex velutina 
Ilex velutinulosa 
Ilex venezuelensis 
Ilex venulosa 
Ilex venusta 
Ilex verisimilis 
Ilex verticillata 
Ilex vesparum 
Ilex victorinii 
Ilex vietnamensis 
Ilex villosula 
Ilex virgata 
Ilex viridis 
Ilex vismiifolia 
Ilex vitiensis 
Ilex volkensiana 
Ilex vomitoria 
Ilex vulcanicola 
Ilex walkeri 
Ilex wallichii 
Ilex walsinghamii 
Ilex × wandoensis 
Ilex warburgii 
Ilex wattii 
Ilex weberlingii 
Ilex wenchowensis 
Ilex wenzelii 
Ilex wightiana 
Ilex williamsii 
Ilex wilsonii 
Ilex wugongshanensis 
Ilex wuiana 
Ilex wurdackiana 
Ilex xiaojinensis 
Ilex yangchunensis 
Ilex yunnanensis 
Ilex yurumanguinis 
Ilex yutajensis 
Ilex zeylanica 
Ilex zhejiangensis 

Some artificial hybrids are also known, including:
Ilex × altaclerensis (Loudon) Dallim. – I. aquifolium × I. perado 
Ilex × koehneana Loes. – I. aquifolium × I. latifolia

References

Ilex